Worawet Chanuthai (Thai: วรเวศ จันทร์อุทัย) or formerly Nantawet Chanuthai (Thai: นันทเวศ จันทร์อุทัย) is a Thai footballer. He played for various teams in Thailand Premier League including Bangkok Bank FC, Provincial Electricity Authority FC (PEA), Thai Port FC and Samut Songkhram F.C. He won the Thailand Premier League in 2008 playing for PEA.

His other teams include Songkhla F.C., Suphanburi F.C., Lampang F.C., Satun United F.C.

He is currently retired from football and works at Songkhla Zoo.

Honours
 Thailand Premier League 2008

References

External links

Living people
Worawet Chanuthai
1983 births
Association football forwards
Worawet Chanuthai
Worawet Chanuthai
Worawet Chanuthai
Worawet Chanuthai